Kockduellen was a Swedish food cooking-contest airing over TV 4. It originally aired between 26 August 1996 – 2000 with Staffan Ling as host, and subsequently with Peder Lamm from 2000-2008.

Among the chefs in the programme were Leif Mannerström, Gert Klötzke, Fredrik Eriksson, Mathias Dahlgren and Christian Hellberg.

Format
Two teams competed against each other in cooking. Every team had one celebrity guest and one professional chef. The guests were given a limit sum of money to use for shopping for the necessary ingredients. Within 20 minutes (from 2008: 15 minutes) they were then required to prepare their foods.

Finally, it was up to the audience to vote for the winning team.

References

TV4 (Sweden) original programming